Johnny Nelson (1905 in Johnstone, Scotland – November 30, 1984 in Yonkers, New York) was a Scottish American soccer center forward who ended his career as the second leading scorer in the history of the first American Soccer League. He was posthumously inducted into the National Soccer Hall of Fame in 2005.

Professional career
At some point as a teenager, Nelson joined the semi-professional Yonkers Thistle of the New York State League. In the spring of 1924, he signed with the Brooklyn Wanderers of the American Soccer League. He played only four games, scoring one goal. While these numbers give little indication of his goal scoring prowess, his first full season in the league showed his full worth. He stormed to fifth place on the goals table with twenty-four in thirty-three games. Before Brooklyn traded him to the Fall River Marksmen for George Graham in March 1928, he scored 101 goals for the team.  Nelson played only eleven games at the end of the 1927–1928 season and another three at the start of the 1928–1929 season in Fall River before he jumped to J&P Coats for twelve games. He then moved to the New York Nationals for the end of the season. On May 18, 1929, Nelson scored two goals for the Nationals in a 2–2 tie with the Providence Clamdiggers in the final of the 1929 American Cup. The Nationals won the rematch two days later. Nelson remained with the Nationals, renamed the New York Giants in 1930, until an April 5, 1931 knee injury ended his career.

Post soccer career
With his career over at age twenty-six, Nelson spent the next thirty years designing carpets for Alexander Smith and Sons Carpet Company of New York City.

National Soccer Hall of Fame
The U.S. National Soccer Hall of Fame inducted Nelson in 2005 as part of a process of recognizing significant pre-1950s players. According to the Hall of Fame, "We were aware that in the early decades of the Hall of Fame a number of outstanding players had slipped through the cracks of the selection process. In order to correct these oversights we established a Blue Ribbon panel consisting of historians Colin Jose, Roger Allaway and Hall of Famer Walter Bahr, to review the credentials of all Veterans from the pre-NASL era. Out of a total of 150 players who met the eligibility criteria, the panel unanimously recommended, and the Board approved, the special induction of these five players."  Nelson was among the five selected.

References

External links
 National Soccer Hall of Fame profile

1905 births
1984 deaths
People from Johnstone
Scottish footballers
British emigrants to the United States
American soccer players
American Soccer League (1921–1933) players
Brooklyn Wanderers players
Fall River Marksmen players
J&P Coats players
New York Nationals (ASL) players
New York Giants (soccer, 1930–1932) players
National Soccer Hall of Fame members
Association football forwards
Scottish expatriate sportspeople in the United States
Expatriate soccer players in the United States
Scottish expatriate footballers